Komin may refer to:

 Komin, Dubrovnik-Neretva County, a village near Ploče, Croatia
 Komin, Zagreb County, a village near Sveti Ivan Zelina, Croatia
 Komin (surname)
Kawamoto Kōmin (1810–1871), Japanese scholar